An international parliament or supranational legislature is a branch of an intergovernmental organization that is similar to a parliament, thus establishing a hybrid system of intergovernmentalism and supranationalism. These could be based on a predecessor inter-parliamentary institution or a newly established organization-level legislature.

International parliaments generally do not have legislative powers; an exception is the European Parliament, which has legislative powers in the European Union.

Such branches of intergovernmental organizations are typically established in order to provide for representation of citizens, rather than governments who are represented in other bodies within the organization. The assembly can be composed of members of the national legislatures (whose members are directly elected in most cases) or of its own directly elected members, further strengthening the supranationalism of the organization.

List of international parliaments

See also
Parliamentary assembly
Inter-Parliamentary Union
International Parliament for Safety and Peace
List of legislatures by country

References

 
Supranational legislatures